Akner, is a village belongs to the municipal community of Alaverdi, in the Lori Province of Armenia.

Population

References

Populated places in Lori Province